Metapsychology (Greek: meta 'beyond, transcending', and ψυχολογία 'psychology') is that aspect of any psychological theory which refers to the structure of the theory itself (hence the prefix "meta") rather than to the entity it describes. The psychology is about the psyche; the metapsychology is about the psychology. The term is used mostly in discourse about psychoanalysis, the psychology developed by Sigmund Freud, which was at its time regarded as a branch of science (with roots in the work of Freud's scientific mentors and predecessors, especially Helmholtz, Brücke, Charcot, and Janet), or, more recently, as a hermeneutics of understanding (with roots in Freud's literary sources, especially Sophocles and, to a lesser extent, Goethe and Shakespeare).  Interest on the possible scientific status of psychoanalysis has been renewed in the emerging discipline of neuropsychoanalysis, whose major exemplar is Mark Solms. The hermeneutic vision of psychoanalysis is the focus of influential works by Donna Orange.

Freud and the als ob problem
Psychoanalytic metapsychology is concerned with the fundamental structure and concepts of Freudian theory. Sigmund Freud first used the term on 13 February 1896 in a letter to Wilhelm Fliess, to refer to his addition of unconscious processes to the conscious ones of traditional psychology. On March 10, 1898, he wrote to Fliess: "It seems to me that the theory of wish fulfillment has brought only the psychological solution and not the biological - or, rather, metapsychical - one. (I am going to ask you seriously, by the way, whether I may use the name metapsychology for my psychology that leads behind consciousness)." Three years after completing his unpublished Project for a Scientific Psychology, Freud's optimism had completely vanished. In a letter dated September 22 of that year he told Fliess: "I am not at all in disagreement with you, not at all inclined to leave psychology hanging in the air without an organic basis. But apart from this conviction, I do not know how to go on, neither theoretically nor therapeutically, and therefore must behave as if [als läge] only the psychological were under consideration. Why I cannot fit it together [the organic and the psychological] I have not even begun to fathom". "When, in his 'Autobiographical Study' of 1925, Freud called his metapsychology a 'speculative superstructure'...the elements of which could be abandoned or changed once proven inadequate, he was, in the terminology of Kant's Critique of Judgment, proposing a psychology als ob or as if – a heuristic model of mental functioning that did not necessarily correspond with external reality."

A salient example of Freud's own metapsychology is his characterization of psychoanalysis as a "simultaneously closed system, fundamentally unrelated and impervious to the external world and as an open system inherently connected and responsive to environmental influence.

In the 1910s, Freud wrote a series of twelve essays, to be collected as Preliminaries to a Metapsychology. Five of these were published independently under the titles: "Instincts and Their Vicissitudes," "Repression," "The Unconscious," "A Metapsychological Supplement to the Theory of Dreams," and "Mourning and Melancholia." The remaining seven remained unpublished, an expression of Freud's ambivalence about his own attempts to articulate the whole of his vision of psychoanalysis.  In 1919 he wrote to Lou Andreas-Salome, "Where is my Metapsychology? In the first place it remains unwritten". In 1920 he published Beyond the Pleasure Principle, a text with metaphysical ambitions.

Midcentury psychoanalyst David Rapaport defined the term thus: "Books on psychoanalysis usually deal with its clinical theory... there exists, however, a fragmentary—yet consistent—general theory of psychoanalysis, which comprises the premises of the special (clinical) theory, the concepts built on it, and the generalizations derived from it... named metapsychology''."

Freud's metapsychology
 The topographical point of view: the psyche operates at different levels of consciousness -  unconscious, preconscious, and conscious
 The dynamic point of view: the notion that there are psychological forces which may conflict with one another at work in the psyche
 The economic point of view: the psyche contains charges of energy which are transferred from one element of the psyche to another
 The structural point of view: the psyche consists of configurations of psychological processes which operate in different ways and reveal different rates of change - the ego, the id, and the superego
 The genetic point of view: the origins - or "genesis" - of psychological processes can be found in developmentally previous psychological processes

Ego psychologist Heinz Hartmann also added 'the adaptive" point of view' to Freud's metapsychology, although Lacan who interpreted metapsychology as the symbolic, the Real, and the imaginary, said "the dimension discovered by analysis is the opposite of anything which progresses through adaptation."

Criticism
Freud's metapsychology has faced criticism, mainly from ego psychology. Object relations theorists such as Melanie Klein, shifted the focus away from intrapsychic conflicts and towards the dynamics of interpersonal relationships, leading to a unifocal theory of development that focused on the mother-child relationship. Most ego psychologists saw the structural point of view, Freud's latest metapsychology, as the most important. Some proposed that only the structural point of view be kept in metapsychology, because the topographical point of view made an unnecessary distinction between the unconscious and the preconscious (Arlow & Brenner) and because the economic point of view was viewed as redundant (Gill).

See also
 Philosophy of mind

References

Further reading
 
 
 
 
 
 

1890s neologisms
Behavioural sciences
Philosophy of psychology
Psychoanalytic theory